John F. English (April 14, 1889 – February 3, 1969) was an American labor union official. A member of the International Brotherhood of Teamsters (IBT), he was appointed as its Secretary-Treasurer by union president Daniel J. Tobin in 1946, and was re-elected to this post at every subsequent Teamsters convention until his death in February 1969 at the age of 80. The organisation itself described English as the "greatest Secretary-Treasurer" it had encountered.

English was noted for being a Teamsters official who maintained a reputation for integrity, and who had openly opposed union president Dave Beck but he also vocally defended Beck's successor, Jimmy Hoffa, and other Teamsters officials who faced accusations of corruption.  Robert F. Kennedy, in his 1960 book about union corruption, The Enemy Within, noted that "no question has ever been raised about John English's integrity" but also described his disappointment after English praised Hoffa at the 1957 Teamsters convention.

References

1889 births
1969 deaths
Trade unionists from Massachusetts
People from Boston
People from Miami
International Brotherhood of Teamsters people